Andy Holden may refer to:

 Andy Holden (footballer) (born 1962), Welsh footballer
 Andy Holden (athlete) (1948–2014), English long-distance runner
 Andy Holden (artist) (born 1982), English artist

See also
 Andrew Holden (born 1960 or 1961),  journalist, editor-in-chief, and media advisor in Australia and New Zealand